Twister is a 1989 American comedy film directed by Michael Almereyda and starring Suzy Amis, Crispin Glover, Harry Dean Stanton, and Dylan McDermott. It was shot in Wichita, Kansas.

Plot
Based on Mary Robison's 1981 novel Oh!, the film relates the story of the eccentric Cleveland family during the event of a tornado's hitting their rural Kansas home. The head of the family is Eugene Cleveland (Stanton), who built soda pop and mini-golf empires and lives off the proceeds.  His two adult children, Maureen (Amis), and Howdy (Glover), live with him in his mansion along with Maureen's daughter Violet, and Lola, the housekeeper. Maureen is plagued by unwanted visits from her ex, Chris (McDermott), who has recently returned from Canada with the intention of marrying Maureen and becoming a father to Violet.  Howdy is enrolled in a local university and pursues rolling interests in painting, music, and theater, all with an absurdist slant.  He is also desperately trying to convince Stephanie, a young groundskeeper from the University, to marry him and go off to Europe.  Eugene, exasperated with Howdy's high-brow attitude and Maureen's sullen listlessness, spends his time drinking and courting Virginia, a local host of a Christian children's TV program.  The group continuously annoy each other, fight, and try to find themselves in an isolated little world where all of the necessities of life are provided, but purpose is lacking.

Howdy finds an envelope with their mother's address and he and Maureen take Violet with them in an effort to track her down.  The address on the envelope leads them to a farm in which they meet an unnamed character played by William Burroughs. Burroughs tells them he bought the farm from her and met her once when they were in escrow; that "Jim" spoke with her mostly. When the kids ask if they can speak to Jim, Burroughs replies: "Jim got kicked in the head by a horse last year. [He] went around killing horses for a while, until he ate the insides of a clock and he died" (a line originally found in John Millington Synge's 1907 play Playboy of the Western World). He then indicates that he thinks she moved to Ireland and that becomes the focus of their drive to see her and forgive her.

Eugene, frustrated with Virginia's condescending attitude toward his family, breaks up with her.  During a particularly heated dinner one evening, Eugene overreacts to Howdy's insults and explodes, tipping over bowls of gazpacho. Howdy reveals to his father that he and Maureen have actively attempted to find their mother.  Eugene informs them that she died in a mental institution and didn't even recognize him toward the end.

Maureen and Chris decide to get married and Stephanie goes back to her old boyfriend. Meanwhile, Eugene absconds from his immediate family and goes off to destinations unknown with Lola.

Cast
Harry Dean Stanton as Eugene Cleveland
Suzy Amis as Maureen Cleveland
Crispin Glover as Howdy Cleveland
Dylan McDermott as Chris
Jenny Wright as Stephanie
Lindsay Christman as Violet
Charlayne Woodard as Lola
Lois Chiles as Virginia
David Brown as Bob Breevort
Tim Robbins as Jeff

Reception 
Dave Kehr wrote in the Chicago Tribune that the film was "worth a look for the unexpected delicacy of its execution and the all-cult quality of its casting" and noted that "Almereyda creates a kind of low-key, unemphatic weirdness that gets its laughs but still leaves room for moments of surprising emotional authenticity."

References

External links

1989 films
1989 comedy films
Vestron Pictures films
Films scored by Hans Zimmer
Films about tornadoes
American comedy films
1980s English-language films
1980s American films